Brian Hugh Ogilvie (born January 30, 1952) is a Canadian former professional ice hockey player. He played 90 games in the National Hockey League for the Chicago Black Hawks and St. Louis Blues between 1972 and 1979. The rest of his career, which lasted from 1972 to 1980, was spent in various minor leagues.

Career statistics

Regular season and playoffs

External links

1952 births
Living people
Canadian expatriate ice hockey players in the United States
Canadian ice hockey centres
Chicago Blackhawks draft picks
Chicago Blackhawks players
Dallas Black Hawks players
Denver Spurs players
Edmonton Oil Kings (WCHL) players
Ice hockey people from Alberta
Kansas City Blues players
People from the County of Stettler No. 6
Providence Reds players
Red Deer Rustlers players
St. Louis Blues players
Salt Lake Golden Eagles (CHL) players
Vancouver Nats players